The Palmero Conspiracy is the name given to a failed plot to overthrow the Spanish colonial government in the Philippines 1828. The Spanish government suppressed further information on this conspiracy.

Background
In 1823, an order, which was from Spain, declared that military officers commissioned in Spain should have precedence of all those appointed in the colonies. This was the reaction of Madrid to the series of wars against Spanish rule that was known as the Spanish American wars of independence. Many Creole military officers were outranked by their Peninsular counterparts. 

An insurgency was staged by a certain Creole captain named Andrés Novales but was suppressed when Fort Santiago did not yield to Novales and his 800 men. Madrid did not notice the growing disaffection in the Philippines, the last major Spanish colony in Asia. In 1828, matters became worse when public officials, mainly provincial governors, were also being replaced by Peninsulars.

Conspiracy
In 1828, two Palmero brothers, scions of a prominent clan in the Philippines, along with the other partisans from the military and the civil service, planned to seize the government. Such was the prominence of the Palmeros (one of whose most famous descendants was Marcelo Azcárraga Palmero) that when the Spanish government discovered the plan, they thought it would be wise to conceal it from the public. The plot itself would embarrass the government since the conspirators were Spaniards themselves and it would seem that Spaniards themselves would want to overthrow the power of Spain in the country. The main conspirators were exiled.

References

1828 in the Philippines
Conflicts in 1828
19th-century rebellions
Conspiracies
Political history of the Philippines
History of the Philippines (1565–1898)
Philippine revolts against Spain